Ross Township is the name of some places in Pennsylvania:

Ross Township, Allegheny County, Pennsylvania
Ross Township, Luzerne County, Pennsylvania
Ross Township, Monroe County, Pennsylvania

Pennsylvania township disambiguation pages